The Ceres Transport Riders' Museum, more commonly known by its Afrikaans name Ceres Togryers Museum, was started during the 1970s by members of the community of Ceres, South Africa  who were interested in preserving the heritage of the town.  It was proclaimed a local museum on 7 November 1978 and established as a province-aided museum with effect from 1 April 1987.  The Board of Trustees is the governing body of the museum with powers vested in it by the Government of the Western Cape Province under the terms of the Cape Museum Ordinance  and is responsible for the institution, its policies, its operational continuity and well-being, and the assets which it holds in trust for the people of Ceres, to whom it is ultimately accountable.
The building in which the museum is housed was built as a flour mill during the early 1930s.  The structure of the building was changed somewhat to accommodate the design by well-known Cape Town heritage architect Gawie Fagan.

The Museum 
The name "Togryers Museum" or Transport Riders’ Museum originated from the huge influence that the transport riders had on the development of Ceres.  The completion of Michell's Pass in 1848  made the town accessible to wagons, and one of the main routes to the diamond fields in Kimberley went through Ceres.

Themes 
The museum houses the following exhibitions:
 Natural history of the Ceres area
 Establishment of Ceres and the lifestyles of its first inhabitants.
 The Transport Riders and their lifestyle
Photographs and articles on the destructive earthquake of 1969,
 A collection of wagons from the area,
 Local History, including development of schools and churches
 The Slave Uprising at Houdenbek Farm
 Apartheid era forced removals during the 1960s and impacts on the local community

Other activities and services 
 Assistance with family/genealogical research
 Educational programmes for primary and secondary schools
Outreach programmes to the youth and elderly
Guided tours of the museum
Historic information to the public for school assignments

Gallery

See also 
Transport museum
 Ox-wagon
Cape cart
Andrew Geddes Bain
Ceres

References

External links 

Museums in the Western Cape
Museums in South Africa
Local museums in South Africa